The siege of Valpovo occurred in 1543 when Suleiman the Magnificent personally led his troops in a campaign against the Habsburgs.

Valpovo was held by Imre Perényi, his son Péter Perényi was one of the greatest Hungarian aristocrats and the last lord of Valpovo. Suleiman the Magnificent personally led his troops in a campaign against the Habsburgs. In 1543 he had his soldiers stationed and a two-month siege commenced. Habsburg commanders made no move to send relief, the Valpovo garrison held out for two months and in the end the Ottomans were able to conquer Valpovo.

References

Battles involving the Ottoman Empire